Lynch Township is a township in Texas County, in the U.S. state of Missouri.

Lynch Township was erected in 1854, taking its name from John Lynch, a pioneer citizen.

References

Townships in Missouri
Townships in Texas County, Missouri